Magalloway Plantation was a plantation in Oxford County, Maine, United States, which de-organized in 2021. The population was 45 at the 2020 census. Part of the Umbagog National Wildlife Refuge is located at its southwest corner.

Geography

The plantation is located along the New Hampshire border in Maine's western mountain region. Various bodies of water are located in the plantation, including Sturtevant Pond, a segment of the Magalloway River, and a portion of Umbagog Lake.

Demographics

As of the census of 2000, there were 37 people, 15 households, and 12 families residing in the plantation. The population density was 0.8 people per square mile (0.3/km2). There were 105 housing units at an average density of 2.2 per square mile (0.8/km2). The racial makeup of the plantation was 100.00% White.

There were 15 households, out of which 26.7% had children under the age of 18 living with them, 80.0% were married couples living together, and 20.0% were non-families. 20.0% of all households were made up of individuals, and 6.7% had someone living alone who was 65 years of age or older. The average household size was 2.47 and the average family size was 2.83.

In the plantation the population was spread out, with 18.9% under the age of 18, 5.4% from 18 to 24, 5.4% from 25 to 44, 40.5% from 45 to 64, and 29.7% who were 65 years of age or older. The median age was 52 years. For every 100 females, there were 117.6 males. For every 100 females age 18 and over, there were 100.0 males.

The median income for a household in the plantation was $33,750, and the median income for a family was $39,167. Males had a median income of $0 versus $25,833 for females. The per capita income for the plantation was $16,546. None of the population and none of the families were below the poverty line.

References

External links

 Maine Genealogy: Magalloway Plantation, Oxford County, Maine

Plantations in Oxford County, Maine
Plantations in Maine